The Paw is a 1931 German thriller film directed by Hans Steinhoff and starring Charlotte Susa, Hans Rehmann, and Fritz Rasp.

It was made as a co-production with the Italian Cines Studios. The film's sets were designed by the art director Daniele Crespi. A separate Italian version The Man with the Claw was also made.

Synopsis
A notorious criminal and serial killer commits a series of murders using a strangely-shaped hand leading the police to nickname him "The Paw". When he murders the engineer of a brand new racing car, one of the drivers takes the investigation into his own hands.

Cast

References

Bibliography

External links 
 

1931 films
1930s thriller films
Films of the Weimar Republic
German thriller films
1930s German-language films
Films directed by Hans Steinhoff
German black-and-white films
German multilingual films
Cines Studios films
1931 multilingual films
1930s German films